Stapleford is a town and civil parish in the Borough of Broxtowe in Nottinghamshire, England,  west of Nottingham. The population at the 2011 census was 15,241.

Geography
Stapleford lies on the border between Nottinghamshire and Derbyshire. To the north of Stapleford is Ilkeston and to the east is Beeston. To the west across the River Erewash is Sandiacre, and in the south is Toton.

Politics
Stapleford is part of Broxtowe borough and the Broxtowe Parliamentary Constituency. From 1935 until 1974 Stapleford was paired with the town of Beeston in the Beeston and Stapleford Urban District, having previously been part of the Stapleford Rural District. The town was parished in 1987 and now has a town council.

The local MP is Darren Henry of the Conservative Party from December 2019, and the town is represented on Nottinghamshire County Council by the Conservative Party and also on Broxtowe Borough Council by two Labour Party, one Conservative Party and one Independent Councillor and two Liberal Democrats. The town council is a mixture of Labour Party, Conservative, Liberal Democrat, Green and 4 Independent Councillors since the election in May 2019.

Brief history

The place-name is first attested in the Domesday Book of 1086, where it appears, unusually, spelt as now, and in the Pipe Rolls of 1197 . The name means "ford marked by a post or posts".

Stapleford's origins can be traced to before the Norman Conquest. In the churchyard of St Helen's church is the Stone Cross which is Saxon and believed to be the oldest Christian monument in the Midlands.
Stapleford owed its development in part to its closeness to the River Trent and the River Erewash as the town became a point of trade. The antiquary John Weever defined an staple town "to be a place, to which by the prince's authority and privilege wool, hides of beasts, wine, corn or grain, and other exotic or foreign merchandize are transferred, carried or conveyed to be sold." The area also expanded in the late 18th century when the stocking hose trade thrived in the Midlands.  Evidence of this history can be found today with the original Stocking Knitters' Houses still standing alongside more modern properties and shops such as on Nottingham Road.
The main crossroads in Stapleford at the junction of Nottingham Road, Derby Road, Toton Lane and Church Street is called The Roach.  The name is from the time when French prisoners from the Napoleonic Wars were set the task of cutting through rock to create roads and this was referred to as La Roche.

Stapleford is also home to the Hemlock Stone on Stapleford Hill. It is approximately 200 million years old, dating to the Triassic Period.

In 2006, a new NHS Health Centre and Walk-In Centre opened in the town, but has since closed and has been succeeded by a large multi use healthcare centre with a mental health unit and cafe on site. Sainsbury's local was opened on the site of the former Total petrol station in 2007.

Stapleford is the home of the Full Mash microbrewery.

Nickname
The town is often referred to informally as "Stabbo".

Notable people
Tom Johnston, football manager and player.
 Arthur Mee, the writer, journalist and educator, was born in Stapleford in 1875.
 Gallipoli hero Walter Richard Parker, VC, lived in Stapleford and is buried in the town cemetery.
 Dave Watson, who was a defender in the Sunderland team that won the FA Cup in 1973, was born in Stapleford in 1946.
 Sir John Borlase Warren, an 18th-century MP for Nottingham and an admiral, lived in Stapleford. The now closed Happy Man and Warren Arms pubs were named after him and his family. A large Wetherspoons named after him is located in the town centre. 
 John Radford, wine and food writer, author and broadcaster, grew up in Stapleford from 1949 to 1965
Frederick Attenborough, academic, principal of University College, Leicester.
 Frederick Randon, cricketer
 Sir Robert Salisbury, renowned educationalist, professor and author
 Alan Charlton, British diplomat

Schools and colleges

Primary schools
Albany Infant and Nursery School
Albany Junior School
Fairfield Primary Academy
Wadsworth Fields Primary School (formerly Fredrick Harrison's Infant school & Stevenson's Junior School)
St John's C of E Primary School (The oldest building still in use as a school in Nottinghamshire)
William Lilley Infant and Nursery School

Secondary schools
George Spencer Academy

Colleges

George Spencer Sixth Form

Transport

Road transport is the primary method of transport in and out of the area.  East Midlands Airport is approximately 10 miles or 16 kilometres away, the airport provides domestic and international routes, focused mainly on EU/EEA/Swiss routes.

Bus

Bus services operate to Nottingham, Derby, Beeston, Ilkeston and other local towns.

Trentbarton 

 i4: Nottingham – QMC – Stapleford – Sandiacre – Risley – Derby.
 my15: Old Sawley – Stapleford – Ilkeston.
 20: Nottingham – QMC – University Boulevard – Boots – Beeston – Ilkeston – Heanor. (Sundays only)
 21: Nottingham – QMC – Stapleford – Kirk Hallam – Ilkeston.

NottsBus 

 510: Beeston – Attenborough – Toton – Stapleford. (Subsidised by Nottinghamshire County Council)
 511: Stapleford Shopper. (Subsidised by Nottinghamshire County Council)

CT4N 
In October 2018, CT4N took over the running of the trentbarton service '18'.

 eighteen: Nottingham - QMC - University Boulevard - Boots - Beeston - Stapleford

Roads
Stapleford is connected to Nottingham, Derby and the M1 motorway by the A52.

Railway

The closest railway station (with regular services) is Beeston providing direct services to Nottingham, Derby, London, Lincoln, Bedford, Burton upon Trent, Leicester, Loughborough, Tamworth, Newark (Castle), Luton, East Midlands Parkway, Birmingham and Matlock.

Light rail
In August 2015, a Light Rail (tram) line was opened towards Stapleford via Beeston and Chilwell as part of the Nottingham Express Transit system.  A park and ride station, called Toton Lane Park & Ride has been built about 1 mile south of Stapleford town centre, and adjacent to some residential areas of the town. It is on Toton Lane, just south of the A52 roundabout, and is the terminus of line 1 of the Phase 2 expansion. There are no plans for extension into the centre of Stapleford.

References

External links
Official site of Stapleford Town Council
Stapleford Town Football Club
Stapleford Community Group Website
Stapleford Website
Broxtowe Borough Council
Local news and events website, includes town history

Towns in Nottinghamshire
Places in the Borough of Broxtowe
Civil parishes in Nottinghamshire